Rheingau Literatur Preis is a literary prize of Hesse. An author is awarded whose prose  gained the attention of the literary critics ("")

The prize of 11,111 Euro is given by the cultural ministry Hessisches Ministerium für Wirtschaft, Verkehr und Landesentwicklung and by the Rheingau Musik Festival. The author also receives 111 bottles of Rheingau Riesling, donated by the association Verband Deutscher Prädikatsweingüter (VDP) Rheingau.

Winners

1994 Stefanie Menzinger, Schlangenbaden, Wanderungen im Inneren des Häftlings
1995 Ulla Berkéwicz, Überlebnis, Sopravvivenza
1996 Herbert Maurer, Sprich günstig mit dem Balkan, Pannonias Zunge
1997 Thomas Meinecke, Tomboy, Hellblau
1998 Hella Eckert, Hanomag, Da hängt mein Kleid
1999 Thomas Lehr, September. Fata Morgana, 42
2000 Peter Stamm, Sieben Jahre, An einem Tag wie diesem
2001 Bodo Kirchhoff, Parlando, Erinnerungen an meinen Porsche
2002 Robert Gernhardt, Reim und Zeit, Gesammelte Gedichte: 1954 – 2006
2003 Reinhard Jirgl, Die Unvollendeten, Abtrünnig: Roman aus der nervösen Zeit
2004 Ralf Rothmann, Feuer brennt nicht, Junges Licht
2005 Gert Loschütz, Auf der Birnbaumwiese, Dunkle Gesellschaft: Roman in zehn Regennächten
2006 Clemens Meyer, Als wir träumten, Gewalten: Ein Tagebuch
2007 Antje Rávik Strubel, Gebrauchsanweisung für Schweden, Kältere Schichten der Luft
2008 Ursula Krechel, Shanghai fern von wo, Ungezürnt: Gedichte, Lichter, Lesezeichen
2009 Christoph Peters, Stadt Land Fluß, Mitsukos Restaurant
2010 , Das Beste, was wir hatten
2011 Josef Haslinger, Jáchymov
2012 Sten Nadolny, Weitlings Sommerfrische
2013 , Soutines letzte Fahrt
2014 , Deutscher Meister
2015 Klaus Modick, Konzert ohne Dichter
2016 Saša Stanišić, Wie der Soldat das Grammofon repariert
2017 Ingo Schulze, Peter Holtz: Sein glückliches Leben erzählt von ihm selbst
2018 Robert Seethaler, Das Feld
2019 Dörte Hansen, Mittagsstunde
2020 Annette Pehnt, Alles was Sie sehen ist neu
2021 Judith Hermann, Daheim
2022 , Zukunftsmusik

References

External links
 

Literary awards of Hesse
Rheingau